Warner Pass is a mountain pass in the Chilcotin Ranges subdivision of the Pacific Ranges, the southernmost division of the Coast Mountains of British Columbia, Canada.  Located southeast of the Taseko Lakes, it is on the divide between Warner and Denain Creeks, which are in the Bridge River and Taseko River drainage respectively, and therefore is on the boundary between the Spruce Lake Protected Area and Tsy'los Provincial Park.

See also
List of mountain passes
Elbow Pass
Grizzly Pass
Griswold Pass
Lord Pass
Tyoax Pass
Wolverine Pass

References

Landforms of the Chilcotin
Bridge River Country
Chilcotin Ranges
Mountain passes of British Columbia